SH-053-R-CH3-2′F is a drug used in scientific research which is a benzodiazepine derivative. It produces some of the same effects as other benzodiazepines, but is much more subtype-selective than most other drugs of this class, having high selectivity, binding affinity and efficacy at the α5 subtype of the GABAA receptor. This gives much tighter control of the effects produced, and so while SH-053-R-CH3-2′F retains sedative and anxiolytic effects, it does not cause ataxia at moderate doses. SH-053-R-CH3-2′F also blocks the nootropic effects of the α5-selective inverse agonist PWZ-029, so amnesia is also a likely side effect.

Replacement of the ester function by an amide, realized in analogs such as MP-III-022 and GL-II-73, improves selectivity, efficacy, and kinetic behavior.

See also 
 QH-ii-066
 SH-I-048A

References 

Ethynyl compounds
Carboxylate esters
Ethyl esters
GABAA receptor positive allosteric modulators
Hypnotics
Imidazobenzodiazepines
Fluoroarenes
Sedatives